The Durmi Lake dam-burst was a flood in the Garhwal Region of India in 1894 caused by a landslide-induced temporary lake.

References

Floods in India
Landslide-dammed lakes
Landslides in 1894
Dam failures in Asia
1894 natural disasters
1894 in India
History of Uttarakhand
Disasters in Uttarakhand
Garhwal division
Landslides in India
1894 disasters in India